Jacob Thompson (May 15, 1810 – March 24, 1885) was the United States Secretary of the Interior, who resigned on the outbreak of the American Civil War and became the Inspector General of the Confederate States Army.

In 1864, Jefferson Davis asked Thompson to lead a delegation to Canada, where he appears to have been leader of the Confederate Secret Service. From here, he is known to have organised many anti-Union plots and was suspected of many more, including a possible meeting with Lincoln's assassin, John Wilkes Booth.

Union troops burned down his mansion in Oxford, Mississippi, the hometown of William Faulkner, who based some of his fictional characters on Thompson.

Early life

Born in Leasburg, North Carolina in 1810 to Nicolas Thompson and Lucretia (van Hook) Thompson, Thompson attended Bingham Academy in Orange County, North Carolina and later went on to graduate from the University of North Carolina in 1831, where he was a member of the Philanthropic Society. Afterwards, he served on the university faculty for a short time until he left to study law in 1832. He was admitted to the bar in 1834 and commenced practice in Pontotoc, Mississippi.

Thompson got involved in politics and was elected to the 26th Congress, serving from 1839 to 1851.

He was appointed to the United States Senate in 1845 but never received the commission, and the seat went to Joseph W. Chalmers. Thompson was the chairman of the Committee on Indian Affairs in the 29th Congress. He lost reelection to the 32nd Congress and went back to practicing law until 1857, when newly elected President James Buchanan appointed Thompson United States Secretary of the Interior.

In the later years of the Buchanan administration, the cabinet members argued with one another on issues of slavery and secession. In an 1859 speech, Thompson advanced a moderate unionist position. He denounced Republicans in the North who spoke of the slavery issue as an "irrepressible conflict" and Southern extremists who favored reopening the Atlantic slave trade.

Congressional Life 
Thompson was Elected and Served in Congress from 1835 to the Five succeeding Congresses 26th (1839–1841), 27th (1841–1843), 28th (1843–1845), 29th (1845–1847), 30th (1847–1849), 31st (1849–1851). During his Congress years, he establishes a law practice in Mississippi in 1837, but also he made an unsuccessful bid to become the state attorney general. But despite his failure, he became a leader in the state Democratic Party; and won a seat in Congress in 1838. But unfortunately, he lost his re-election to the thirty-second Congress. But when he lost his election to his seventh term in office, He returned home in Mississippi, but in 1853, when President Franklin Pierce offered him to become a U.S Consul to Havana he refused it, And also he became an unccescesful candidate after losing in 1855 senate election to Jefferson Davis. Two Years later President James Buchanan appointed Thompson to become his secretary of the Interior from 1857 to 1861

Alignment with Confederacy
While still serving as Interior Secretary, Thompson was appointed by the state of Mississippi as a "secession commissioner" to North Carolina, with the task of trying to convince that state to secede from the Union in the wake of the 1860 presidential election. On December 17, he passed through Baltimore on the way to North Carolina. "Secretary Thompson has entered openly into the secession service, while professing still to serve the Federal authority," the New York Times reported on December 20. The next day, Thompson met with Governor John W. Ellis in Raleigh. He wrote an open letter to Ellis which was published in the Raileigh State Journal on December 20. Thompson wrote that the South faced "common humiliation and ruin" if it remained in the Union. He warned that a Northern "majority trained from infancy to hate our people and their institutions" would overthrow slavery. The result would be "the subjugation of our people."

Thompson resigned as Interior Secretary in January 1861. When he resigned, Horace Greeley's New-York Daily Tribune denounced him as "a traitor", remarking,  "Undertaking to overthrow the Government of which you are a sworn minister may be in accordance with the ideas of cotton-growing chivalry, but to common men cannot be made to appear creditable."

Thompson became Inspector General of the Confederate States Army. Though not a military man, Thompson later joined the army as an officer and served as an aide to General P.G.T. Beauregard at the Battle of Shiloh.

He attained the rank of lieutenant colonel and was present at several other battles in the Western Theater of the war, including Corinth, Vicksburg, and Tupelo.

Commissioner in Canada

In March 1864, Jefferson Davis asked Thompson to lead a secret delegation in Canada. He accepted and arrived in Montreal in May of that year. Thompson appears to have been the leader of Confederate Secret Service operations in Canada.

From there, he directed a failed plot to free Confederate prisoners of war on Johnson's Island, off Sandusky, Ohio, in September. He also arranged the purchase of a steamer, with the intention of arming it to harass shipping in the Great Lakes. Regarded in the North as a schemer and conspirator, many devious plots were associated with his name, though much of this may have been public hysteria.

On June 13, 1864, Thompson met with former New York Governor Washington Hunt at Niagara Falls. According to the testimony of the Peace Democrat Clement Vallandigham, Hunt met Thompson, talked to him about creating a Northwestern Confederacy, and obtained money for arms, which was routed to a subordinate. Thompson gave Benjamin Wood, the owner of the New York Daily News, money to purchase arms.

One plot was a planned burning of New York City on November 25, 1864 in retaliation for Union Generals Philip Sheridan and William Tecumseh Sherman's scorched-earth tactics in the South.

Some speculate that John Wilkes Booth, who assassinated Abraham Lincoln, met Thompson, but that has not been proved. (In the years after the war, Thompson worked hard to clear his name of involvement in the assassination.) His manor, called "Home Place," in Oxford, Mississippi was burned down by Union troops in 1864.

Postwar
After the Civil War, Thompson fled to England and later returned to Canada as he waited for passions to cool in the United States. He eventually came home and settled in Memphis, Tennessee, to manage his extensive holdings. Thompson was later appointed to the board of the University of the South at Sewanee and was a great benefactor of it.

Death
Jacob Thompson died in Memphis and was interred in Elmwood Cemetery. Republicans and Union veterans condemned the Grover Cleveland administration's lowering of flags to half-mast in Washington and Secretary of Interior Lucius Quintus Cincinnatus Lamar II's closure of the Department of Interior to honor Thompson after his death.

In popular culture
 A self-igniting liquid, referred to as "Greek fire" in Season 1 Episodes 7–11 of the BBC America television series Copper, is featured as part of a plot by Confederate Secret Service agents to burn down New York City.

References

Bibliography

External links
 Retrieved on 2009-5-12
The Jacob Thompson Collection (MUM00266) can be found in the William and Marjorie Lewis Collection at the University of Mississippi in the Archives and Special Collections.

1810 births
1885 deaths
19th-century American politicians
United States Secretaries of the Interior
People of North Carolina in the American Civil War
Buchanan administration cabinet members
Democratic Party members of the United States House of Representatives from Mississippi